Hreša is a village located near Sarajevo, capital of Bosnia and Herzegovina. Hreša is located in Istočni Stari Grad, municipality in Istočno Sarajevo, Republika Srpska, Bosnia and Herzegovina. It was also known as Srpski Stari Grad, and was created from part of the pre-war municipality of Stari Grad (the other part of the pre-war municipality is now in the Federation of Bosnia and Herzegovina). Hreša is the biggest place of Istočni Stari Grad (East Old Town).

Hreša got name by "Hreša" rock (originally Reša), very well known kind of rock in Balkan peninsula. A lot of Sarajevo's streets are built of hreša rock. Also, there are a lot of gravestones in Bosnia and Herzegovina made of hreša rock.

Demographics 
According to the 2013 census, its population was 214, with 194 of them living in the Republika Srpska part and 20 living in the Federation part.

References

Populated places in Istočni Stari Grad
Villages in Republika Srpska
Populated places in Stari Grad, Sarajevo